HMCS Longueuil was a River-class frigate that served in the Royal Canadian Navy during the Second World War. She served primarily as a convoy escort in the Battle of the Atlantic. She was named for Longueuil, Quebec.

Longueuil was ordered in October 1941 as part of the 1942-1943 River-class building program. She was laid down on 17 July 1943 by Canadian Vickers Ltd. at Montreal and launched on 30 October 1943. Longueuil was commissioned into the RCN at Quebec City on 18 May 1944 with the pennant K672.

War service
She arrived at her homeport of Halifax, Nova Scotia and undertook work up training at Bermuda under the command of Lt. Cdr. M.J. Woods, RCNVR, her only commanding officer.

Her first convoy escort took place with Convoy HX 302 which departed New York City on 4 August 1944 and arrived at Liverpool on 17 August.  Longueuil was deployed with the convoy from 8 August until 13 August.

With victory in Europe seemingly imminent, the RCN deployed Longueuil to Esquimalt in June 1945 in preparation for Operation Downfall, the Allied invasion of Japan.  Longueuil joined the RCN's Pacific Fleet only weeks before the Surrender of Japan following the atomic bombings of Hiroshima and Nagasaki. She began a tropicalization refit in preparation for her service in the Pacific Ocean, but that was cancelled upon the surrender of Japan. Longueuil was paid off from the RCN on 31 December 1946 and the decision was made to dismantle her armaments and scuttle her to form a breakwater in Kelsey Bay, British Columbia in 1947.

See also
 List of ships of the Canadian Navy

References

External links
 HMCS Longueuil (K672) readyayeready.com

River-class frigates of the Royal Canadian Navy
1943 ships
Culture of Longueuil